Little Bitterroot Lake is a small lake in northwest Montana.  It is located in the town of Marion, Montana.

See also
List of lakes in Flathead County, Montana (A-L)

References

Lakes of Montana
Lakes of Flathead County, Montana